Vicirionessa occidentalis is a jumping spider in the genus Vicirionessa that lives in Nigeria. It was first described in 2011 by Anthony Russell-Smith and Wanda Wesołowska as Brancus occidentalis, and transferred by them to their new genus Vicirionessa in 2022.

References

Endemic fauna of Nigeria
Salticidae
Spiders described in 2011
Spiders of Africa
Taxa named by Wanda Wesołowska